Alfred Louncke (14 December 1899 – 17 April 1976) was a French weightlifter. He competed in the men's light-heavyweight event at the 1924 Summer Olympics.

References

External links
 

1899 births
1976 deaths
French male weightlifters
Olympic weightlifters of France
Weightlifters at the 1924 Summer Olympics
Sportspeople from Roubaix